Joseph Mackey Brown (December 28, 1851 – March 3, 1932) was an American politician. He served two non-consecutive terms as  the 59th governor of Georgia, the first from 1909 to 1911 and the second from 1912 to 1913. He has also been posthumously implicated as one of the ringleaders in the lynching of Leo Frank.

Early life
Brown was born in Canton, Georgia and was the son of Georgia's Civil War Governor Joseph E. Brown. The family nickname of the younger Brown was "Little Joe Brown".

After graduating from Oglethorpe University in 1872 (where he joined Chi Phi fraternity), Brown attended Harvard University for a time to study law. He continued his studies at his brother's Georgia law practice and passed the bar in 1873; however, he never practiced law due to failing eyesight. He continued his studies at an Atlanta, Georgia business college and became a clerk with the Western and Atlantic Railroad. During his career at the railroad he rose to the position of traffic manager for the company, and he married Cora Annie McCord.

Career
In 1904, Brown was appointed to the Georgia State Railroad Commission by then-Governor Joseph M. Terrell. That appointment was rescinded in 1907 when the new Governor, Hoke Smith, removed Brown over disagreements about passenger fares.

Brown exacted revenge by running against Smith in the 1908 gubernatorial election and winning. Smith again won the governorship in the election of 1910 by beating Brown in the Democratic primary and in the general election in which Brown ran as an independent. Smith left before the end of his second term to assume the United States Senate seat that became vacant upon the death of Alexander S. Clay, and Brown ran unopposed to become Governor again for the rest of Smith's original term.

Brown faced Smith once again in the 1914 election for the Senate seat previously filled by Smith. Smith won that election.

Brown also wrote two books, The Mountain Campaigns in Georgia (1886) and Astyanax (1907), served as director and vice president of the First National Bank of Marietta, and owned and operated Cherokee Mills in Marietta.
.

On August 17, 1915, he was involved in the murder of Leo Frank, according to Professor Stephen Goldfarb.

Death
Brown died in 1932 in Marietta, Georgia and is buried in the Oakland Cemetery in Atlanta, Georgia.

References

External links
 The New Georgia Encyclopedia entry for Joseph M. Brown
 This Day in Georgia History:March 3, Ed Jackson and Charly Pou, Carl Vinson Institute of Government, The University of Georgia
 Portrait of Joseph M. Brown
 Georgia Governor's Gravesites Field Guide (1776-2003)
 Joseph M. Brown campaign button
 
Joseph M. Brown Papers at Stuart A. Rose Manuscript, Archives, & Rare Book Library, Emory University

Democratic Party governors of Georgia (U.S. state)
1851 births
1932 deaths
American white supremacists
Burials at Oakland Cemetery (Atlanta)
Harvard Law School alumni
Oglethorpe University alumni
American murderers
Lynching in the United States
People from Canton, Georgia
Writers from Georgia (U.S. state)
20th-century American politicians